The 2014–15 film awards season began in December 2014 with the Gotham Independent Film Awards 2014 and ended in February 2015 with the 87th Academy Awards. Major winners for the year included The Grand Budapest Hotel, Birdman or (The Unexpected Virtue of Ignorance), Boyhood, Whiplash, and The Theory of Everything, among others.

Award ceremonies

Films by awards gained

References

American film awards